Battle of Sirte may refer to military events, either in the Gulf of Sidra or in the Libyan city of Sirte located on its shore.  

 during the Battle of the Mediterranean of World War II:
 First Battle of Sirte, fought on 17 December 1941
 Second Battle of Sirte, fought on 22 March 1942
 as part of Libya–United States relations during Cold War
 Gulf of Sidra incident (1981)
 during Libyan Civil War of 2011 (fall of Muammar Gaddafi)
 Second Gulf of Sidra offensive, fought from 22 August to 20 October 2011 during the Libyan civil war
 Battle of Sirte (2011), fought from 15 September to 20 October 2011 during the Libyan civil war
 during Second Libyan Civil War
 Battle of Sirte (2015), fall of Sirte to ISIL
 Battle of Sirte (2016), Government of National Accord effort to liberate Sirte from ISIL
 Battle of Sirte (2020), the Libyan National Army captured Sirte from the Government of National Accord